Goma is the capital of North Kivu province in the eastern Democratic Republic of the Congo. It is located on the northern shore of Lake Kivu, next to the Rwandan city of Gisenyi. The lake and the two cities are in the Albertine Rift, the western branch of the East African Rift system. The recent history of Goma has been dominated by the volcano and the Rwandan genocide of 1994, which in turn fuelled the First and Second Congo Wars. The aftermath of these events was still having effects on the city and its surroundings in 2010. The city was captured by rebels of the March 23 Movement during the M23 rebellion in late 2012, but it has since been retaken by government forces.

Goma is the home of the annual Amani Festival which celebrates peace and in 2020 it attracted an audience of 36,000.

History

Originally just a way-point for lake traffic and a crossroads for the overland trade routes between Central Africa and the Indian Ocean, in 1894, the explorer Gustav Adolf von Götzen followed in the footsteps of a missionary from the eastern coast of Africa. While he was going to Rwanda, he discovers a small village called Ngoma which he recorded as Goma. Later in the 1890s, officers of the Congo Free State established a trading post at Goma to control traffic on Lake Kivu. The city developed from 1910 when Belgium established an administrative center there.

1994 refugee crisis
The Rwandan genocide of 1994 was perpetrated by the provisional Rwandan government on the Tutsi population and Hutu moderates. In response the Rwandan Patriotic Front (RPF), formed by Tutsi refugees in Uganda, which already controlled large areas of northern Rwanda following its 1990 invasion and the ongoing Civil War, overthrew the Hutu government in Kigali and forced it out. One of the many UN missions attempted to provide a safe zone in the volatile situation and provided safe passage for the refugees. From 13 June to 14 July 1994, 10,000 to 12,000 refugees per day crossed the border to Goma. The massive influx created a severe humanitarian crisis, as there was an acute lack of shelter, food and water. However, the Zaïrean government took it upon itself to garner attention for the situation. Shortly after the arrival of nearly one million refugees, a deadly cholera outbreak claimed thousands of lives in the Hutu refugee camps around Goma. RPF aligned forces, mainly actors in the conflict, crossed the border and in acts of revenge also claimed several lives.

First Congo War
Hutu militias and members of the Hutu provisional government were among the refugees, and they set up operations from the camps around Goma attacking ethnic Tutsis in the Kivus and Rwandan government forces at the border. For political reasons the Kinshasa government of the then Zaire led by Joseph Mobutu did not prevent the attacks, and so the Rwandan government and its Ugandan allies threw their support behind the Alliance of Democratic Forces for the Liberation of Zaire, a rebel movement led by Laurent Kabila against Mobutu. Rwandan forces stormed the camps at Goma, resulting in thousands of additional deaths, and with their help and that of Uganda, Kabila went on to overthrow Mobutu's regime in the First Congo War, which ended in 1997.

Second Congo War
Within a year Kabila had quarrelled with his former allies, and in 1998 the Rwandan government backed a Goma-based rebel movement against Kabila, the Congolese Rally for Democracy (RCD, sometimes called RCD-Goma) made of Banyamulenge people, related to the Tutsis. They captured Bukavu and other towns, and the Second Congo War began. The Goma refugee camps, in which the Hutu had created a militia called the FDLR (Democratic Force for the Liberation of Rwanda), were again attacked by Rwandan government forces and the RCD.

The Second Congo War was unprecedented in Africa for the loss of civilian life in massacres and atrocities. By 2003 the Banyamulenge had become tired of the war and friction emerged between them and Rwanda. In 2002 and 2003 a fragile negotiated peace emerged between the many sides involved in the war.

Conflict since the end of the war

There have been numerous outbreaks of violence since 2003. The Hutu FDLR remains in the forests and mountains north and west of Goma, carrying out attacks on the Rwandan border and on the Banyamulenge. The Congolese defence forces are unable or unwilling to stop them, and as a consequence Rwanda continues to support Banyamulenge rebels such as the RCD and General Nkunda, and to carry out incursions into North Kivu in pursuit of the FDLR.

In September 2007 large-scale fighting threatened to break out again as the 8,000-strong militia of General Nkunda, based around Rutshuru, broke away from integration with the Congolese army and began attacking them in the town of Masisi north-west of Goma. MONUC (United Nations Mission in the Democratic Republic of Congo) began airlifting Congolese troops into Goma and transferring them by helicopter from Goma International Airport to Masisi.

On October 27, 2008, the Battle of Goma broke out in the city between the Congolese army, supported by MONUC, and Nkunda's CNDP rebels; 200,000 refugees fled the town.
On 3 November 2012 there was a clash between Congolese and Rwandan troops on the border just north of Goma. Goma was later seized by the M23 movement on November 20, 2012. "Tens of thousands" of civilians fled the area. In August 2019, Health Minister Diane Gashumba of Rwanda stated that students will stop going to school in Goma, a city in the Democratic Republic of Congo that is close to border over Ebola fears.

The Italian ambassador, Luca Attanasio, was killed in an apparent kidnapping attempt near Virunga National Park. He was part of the U.N.'s World Food Programme (WFP). Two others were also killed.

2018–2020 Ebola epidemic
A pastor infected during the 2018–2020 Kivu Ebola epidemic in the region was found in mid-July 2019 to have travelled to Goma.

The COVID-19 pandemic in the Democratic Republic of the Congo caused the cancellation of the Amani Festival in 2021 but it resumed as usual in February of 2022.

Politics

Goma is represented in the National Assembly by five deputies/Representatives:
Jean Batiste Kasekwa (ECIDE)
Hubert Furuguta (UNC)
Patrick Munyomo  (AFDC)
Elvis Mutiri (ADR)
Josue Mufula (LDIC)

List of mayors
 Kana Guzangamana 1989–1991
 Mingale Mwenemalibu in 1991
 Athanase Kahanya Kimuha Tasi 1991–1999
 Mashako Mamba Sebi 1993–1999
 Kisuba shebaeni 1996–1998
 Francois-Xavier Nzabara Masetsa 1998–2005
 Polydore Wundi Kwavwirwa 2005–2008
 Roger Rachid Tumbula, circa 2008–2011 Poursuite de l’opération ‹ destruction des constructions anarchiques›
 Jean Busanga Malihaseme, In 2011–?
 Kubuya Ndoole Naason, 2012–?
 Dieudonné Malere, 2015–?
 Timothée Mwisa Kyese, 2018–present

Volcanic activity around Goma
The Great Rift Valley is being pulled apart, leading to earthquakes and the formation of volcanoes in the area.

2002 eruption of Nyiragongo

Agencies monitoring the volcano were able to give a warning and most of the population of Goma evacuated to Gisenyi. The lava destroyed 40% of the city (more than 4,500 houses and buildings). There were some fatalities caused by the lava and by emissions of carbon dioxide, which causes asphyxiation. The lava also covered over the northern 1 km of the  runway of Goma International Airport, isolating the terminal and apron which were at that end. The lava can easily be seen in satellite photographs, and aircraft can be seen using the 2-km (6,500-ft) southern section of the runway which is clear of lava.

In 2005, volcanic activity again threatened the city.

Currently the scientists at Goma are monitoring Nyiragongo.

2021 eruption of Nyiragongo

The city's evacuation plan was activated on 22 May 2021 when Mount Nyiragongo erupted. Flows of lava reportedly closed a road and entered the city's airport.

Threat posed by Lake Kivu

Lake Kivu is one of three lakes in Africa identified as having huge quantities of dissolved gas held at pressure in its depths. The other two, Cameroon's Lake Monoun and Lake Nyos, experienced limnic eruptions or 'lake overturns', catastrophic releases of suffocating carbon dioxide probably triggered by landslides. Lake Nyos's overturn in 1986 was particularly lethal, killing nearly two thousand people in the area around the lake. Kivu is 2,000 times bigger than Lake Nyos and also contains dissolved methane as an additional hazard – though concentration of carbon dioxide is much lower than in Lake Nyos. Nearly two million people, including the population of Goma, live in the vicinity of Lake Kivu and could be in danger from a limnic eruption triggered by one of the nearby volcanoes and the earthquakes associated with them.

The phenomenon known locally as 'mazuku' has killed children even more recently.

Transport
Goma International Airport (GOM Iata code) provides domestic flights and two international destinations -  Entebbe and Nairobi (Ethiopian Airlines and Jambojet). The city lies on the Rwandan border and neighboring Gisenyi is connected to Kigali, the Rwandan capital, by road and regular buses travel between these cities in under four hours. Goma is connected to Bukavu by ferries, to Butembo, Beni, Bunia and Kisangani either by domestic flights or by road, and regular buses travel from Goma to these cities. It takes one to two days of travel (by bus) to arrive in those cities.

Climate 
Köppen-Geiger climate classification system classifies Goma's climate as a tropical savanna climate (Aw). Goma is much milder than most climates of its type due to the city's high altitude, and sees warm days and pleasant nights year-round.

Other features of Goma

The Goma International Airport accepts commercial charter flights and also, passenger flights operated by Ethiopian Airlines & Jambojet travel to Addis Ababa and Nairobi.
Goma has four or five lakeside wharves totaling about 130 m, the longest being about 80 m.
Virunga National Park, home to endangered mountain gorillas, lies north of the city.
As of 2014, an art gallery had opened, featuring local woodcarving, painting, and puppets.
Goma hosts a Catholic priest seminary Redemptoris Mater run by the Neocatechumenal Way.
The roads in Goma were in poor repair for about 2 decades, and also many roads were heavily damaged from the volcanic lava flow disasters. Many roads began to be rebuilt as of 2011, primarily by Chinese contractors, and the city is being renovated either by public and private contractors, as well as by MONUSCO.
On March 16, 2013 United Nations Volunteers and the MONUSCO organised a Tshukudu race in Goma.

See also
Lake Kivu
AS Kabasha
INNOSS'B
DC Virunga
Mount Nyiragongo 
 Twinning between the city of Goma and the town of Woluwe-Saint-Pierre, Belgium.
List of twin towns and sister cities in Europe

References

External links

 
 Tom Casadevall of the United States Geological Survey; "The 1994 Rwandan Refugee Crisis: Cultural Awareness in Managing Natural Disasters" (1h28m streaming video). Lecture given at University of Illinois at Urbana-Champaign on vulcanology around Goma
 Jordhus-Lier, David: Life and Death in the Great Lakes Region. The NIBR International Blog, 15.02.2010.

 
Populated places in North Kivu
Populated places on Lake Kivu
Cities in the Great Rift Valley
Democratic Republic of the Congo–Rwanda border crossings